CFRE-DT (channel 11) is a television station in Regina, Saskatchewan, Canada, part of the Global Television Network. The station is owned and operated by network parent Corus Entertainment, and maintains studios on Hoffer Drive and McDonald Street on the northeast side of Regina; its transmitter is located near Louis Riel Trail/Highway 11, northwest of the city.

History
The Tower was constructed by Towerectors, a company that specialized in constructing Communications Towers. Towerectors was owned and operated by Gerhard F. Hein and George Anderson.

The station first signed on the air on September 6, 1987, under the ownership of Canwest. CFRE and its sister station in Saskatoon, CFSK, were branded as "STV", and became part of the CanWest Global System in 1990 until the Global Television Network brand was expanded to all of Canwest's stations in 1997.

News operation

CFRE-DT presently broadcasts 24½ hours of local newscasts each week (with 4½ hours each weekday and one hour each on Saturdays and Sundays). The station also airs the public affairs program Focus Saskatchewan.

On May 31, 2011, Shaw Media announced that a new local weekday morning newscast would begin broadcasting on CFRE in late-August 2011. The morning newscast runs for three hours from 6 to 9 a.m. On August 11, 2011, it was announced that Heather Anderson would anchor the program.

In late 2011, CFRE-DT became the first television station in the Regina market to begin broadcasting its local newscasts in high definition. On August 20, 2012, CFRE expanded its half-hour 10 p.m. newscast to one hour, and changed the name of the program from Prime News to News Hour Final (it has since been renamed Global News at 10); the addition of the morning newscast and the expansion of the prime time newscast was part of an expansion of local news programming on Global owned-and-operated stations across Canada as part of a benefits package that was included as a condition of the sale of the Global Television Network to Shaw Communications.

Starting in August 2015, Global News at 10 and all weekend news programming was being produced out of Toronto; anchors were provided by the centralized news operation, but the broadcasts continued to feature local reporting. However, local news anchors have since returned to the weekday broadcast on Global News at 10. The program is hosted by Global Regina anchors Carlyle Fiset and Elise Darwish, who also produce the newscasts at 6 and 10 for Global Saskatoon. Although the newscasts are anchored from Regina, Global Regina no longer has a permanent evening weather specialist. Instead, meteorologist Peter Quinlan from Global Saskatoon anchors Global Regina's weather reports. Weekend newscasts are still produced in Toronto and anchored by Mark Carcasole.

Technical information

Subchannel

Analogue-to-digital conversion
On August 10, 2011, three weeks before Canadian television stations in CRTC-designated mandatory markets were slated to transition from analogue to digital broadcasts, CFRE flash cut its digital signal into operation on VHF channel 11. On June 13, 2019, the CRTC approved a request by Corus to shut down CFRE-TV-2 in Fort Qu'Appelle.

References

External links
Global Regina

FRE-DT
FRE-DT
Television channels and stations established in 1987
Corus Entertainment
1987 establishments in Saskatchewan